Lake City College Preparatory Academy is a nationally accredited private Christian school founded in 2007 and located in Lake City, South Carolina. In 2009 the school was granted a charter by the state of South Carolina. After admitting many at-risk students from the local public schools in the surrounding area, the school struggled trying to improve student academic achievement levels. In April 2014 the state superintendent announced that the school eventually received a "B" rating.  In August 2014 its charter was revoked due to ongoing issues.

References

External links
Lake City College Preparatory Academy website
/www.schooldigger.com

Public elementary schools in South Carolina
Public middle schools in South Carolina
Charter schools in South Carolina
Schools in Florence County, South Carolina
Educational institutions established in 2010
2010 establishments in South Carolina
Public high schools in South Carolina